The 1985 Paris–Nice was the 43rd edition of the Paris–Nice cycle race and was held from 3 March to 10 March 1985. The race started in Nanterre and finished at the Col d'Èze. The race was won by Sean Kelly of the Skil team.

Route and stages
The race began with a short prologue individual time trial and featured seven road stages, including a team time trial and finishing with a mountain time trial.

General classification

References

1985
1985 in road cycling
1985 in French sport
March 1985 sports events in Europe
1985 Super Prestige Pernod International